Artur Brusenbauch (24 November 1881 – 18 January 1957) was an Austrian painter. His work was part of the painting event in the art competition at the 1928 Summer Olympics.

References

External links
Gedächtnis des Landes: Artur Brusenbauch
Artnet.de: Artur Brusenbauch

1881 births
1957 deaths
20th-century Austrian painters
Austrian male painters
Olympic competitors in art competitions
Artists from Bratislava
20th-century Austrian male artists